NI Railways, also known as Northern Ireland Railways (NIR); and for a brief period Ulster Transport Railways (UTR), is the railway operator in Northern Ireland. NIR is a subsidiary of Translink, whose parent company is the Northern Ireland Transport Holding Company (NITHCo), and is one of seven publicly owned train operators in the United Kingdom, the others being Direct Rail Services, Northern Trains, Transport for Wales Rail, Southeastern, LNER, and ScotRail. It has a common Board of Management with the other two companies in the group, Ulsterbus and Metro (formerly Citybus).

The rail network in Northern Ireland is not part of the National Rail network of Great Britain, nor does it use Standard Gauge, instead using Irish Gauge in common with the Republic of Ireland. Also, NIR is the only commercial non-heritage passenger operator in the United Kingdom to operate a vertical integration model, with responsibility of all aspects of the network including running trains, maintaining rolling stock and infrastructure, and pricing.  Since the Single European Railway Directive 2012, the company has allowed open access operations by other rail operators, although no operator has started such a service. In 2019, NI Railways carried over 15 million passengers.

NIR jointly runs the Enterprise train service between Belfast and Dublin with Iarnród Éireann.  There is no link to the rail system in Great Britain; proposals have been made, but allowances would have to be made for the different rail gauge (standard gauge) in use in Britain and Ireland (Irish gauge).

History
From the early 20th century until 1948, the three main railway companies in Northern Ireland were the Great Northern Railway Ireland (GNRI), which had around one half of its network north of the border; the Northern Counties Committee (NCC), owned by the Midland Railway of England and later the London, Midland and Scottish Railway (LMS); and the small Belfast and County Down Railway (BCDR). The Transport Act (Northern Ireland) 1948 created the Ulster Transport Authority (UTA), which took over the BCDR later that year, followed by the NCC in 1949 as a result of the Ireland Act 1949. In 1958, the GNRI was dissolved and its lines north of the border were also taken over by the UTA. Under the UTA's management, the railway network of Northern Ireland shrank from 900 miles (1,450 km) to 225 miles (362 km). The UTA was split into rail and road operations in 1967, and the rail operations were taken over by the present company Northern Ireland Railways (NIR).
Suffering frequent disruption and damage to infrastructure caused by the Troubles and starved of investment by successive political administrations, the NIR network had become badly run down by the 1960s, with old rolling stock and poorly maintained track. NIR's last steam locomotives were withdrawn in 1970.
In 1970, NIR re-launched the once-popular Enterprise between Dublin and Belfast with three new NIR Class 101 diesel locomotives built by Hunslet in England and Mark 2B carriages built by British Rail Engineering Limited (BREL). Despite frequent interruptions due to bomb scares, the service has remained a more or less constant feature of the NIR network.

As older trains became obsolete in the 1970s, the Class 80 slam-door diesel-electric multiple unit was introduced. BREL built these units between 1974 and 1977 to British Rail's Mark 2 design with some trailer cars rebuilt from hauled stock. The power cars were powered by an English Electric 4SRKT engine, nicknamed 'Thumpers' due to their characteristic sound, and had two English Electric 538 traction motors. These entered service on the suburban lines around Belfast, becoming a stalwart on the whole network. They remained in service until 2012, latterly primarily on the Larne-Belfast line and the Coleraine-Portrush Line. In the early 1980s, NIR purchased one of the prototype LEV Railbuses built to test the railbus concept. This was intended for the Coleraine-Portrush branch, but was withdrawn due to the capacity constraints of a single car. A plan was mooted to use it on the Lisburn-Antrim line to prevent it from being closed. This proposal failed, again because of the limited capacity.

NIR has three EMD class 111 locomotives, 111–113, for freight and passenger use, built in October 1980 (111–112) and December 1984 (113). During the eighties it was apparent that additional trains would be needed. BREL built nine 450 Class sets on former Mark 1 underframes between 1985 and 1987. The power cars had an English Electric 4SRKT engine recovered from former 70 Class units (except 459, which used the engine recovered from 80 Class power car 88) and had two English Electric 538 traction motors. The sets were three-car diesel-electric multiple units, based on a more modern British design, with air-operated sliding doors. They were withdrawn from service in 2012 and replaced by new 4000 Class diesel multiple units. In 1994, NIR bought two EMD 208 Class locomotives identical to Iarnród Éireann's 201 Class. These haul the cross-border Enterprise dedicated trains of modern carriages.

Since 2002, NIR has modernised its rolling stock, with a full fleet replacement of new trains built by the Spanish company CAF. 23 Class 3000 diesel multiple units made up the first batch of trains ordered at a cost of £80million. They offered greater capacity, performance and accessibility than their predecessors when they were delivered in 2004 and 2005. The next order was for 20 Class 4000s, built 2010–2012. These offered similar benefits to the Class 3000s and completed the fleet replacement. Additionally, NIR has purchased 23 new carriages, via an option in the existing Class 4000 train procurement contract, these are to be used to extend Seven trains from three cars to six cars,which will add much more capacity and will also allow only one guard to be needed on a six-car train, which required two before.

Performance
The latest performance figures for NIR according to Translink are 99% of trains arriving at the final destination within five minutes and 100% within ten minutes of the scheduled time.  Among other accolades, NIR won the UK Rail Business of the Year Award for 2008.

NIR carried 13.4million passengers in 2014–15 (up from 10.4million in 20102011), representing 417million passenger-km and earning £43.6million in ticket sales.

In 20182019, NIR recorded 15.8million passenger journeys, the largest in the company's 50-year history.

Rolling stock

Current fleet 

NIR purchased the two Class 201s to operate the new De Dietrich Stock that is operated exclusively on the Belfast-Dublin Line, NIR own half of the 28 De Dietrich stock coaches used by the Enterprise Belfast-Dublin service. These units have their own unique livery, and do not operate under NIR branding or on any other services in Northern Ireland or the Republic. In 2005, NIR investigated obtaining seven Class 222 DEMUs built for English operator Midland Mainline to use for Enterprise, but these entered service with their intended operator. They would have required significant modification to enable NIR to use them, including conversion from standard gauge to Irish gauge.

NIR retained one Class 80 unit (three power cars and two driving trailers) as its sandite train during the 2012-2017 leaf fall seasons. It was planned that a Class 450 unit was to be used for this role. However, in 2015, Translink awarded a contract to Windhoff Bahn AG to procure a new double ended multi-purpose vehicle to undertake sandite and high-pressure water spraying, as well as weed killing operations.

"New Trains" fleet replacement 

In 2004/2005, NIR received 23 Class 3000 diesel multiple units from CAF of Spain in a £80million order. The final unit, 3023, arrived in Belfast Harbour on Monday 18 July 2005. All units had entered service by 24 September 2005. A maintenance contract with CAF for these vehicles was extended in May 2020 for another 15 years.

In 2007, NIR announced plans to purchase up to 20 trains under its "New Trains 2010" proposal following the confirmation of its expected budget. This fleet replaced the remaining Class 80 and Class 450 trains by March 2012. Renamed as "New Trains Two", this project went out to tender in late 2007. In March 2009 it was announced that CAF had been selected to build the new fleet, named Class 4000. The first units were delivered in March 2011, with entry into service in September 2011

In December 2018, NIR, announced that 21 additional carriages would be purchased from CAF at the cost of £50million, via an option in the existing Class 4000 train procurement contract. The first of the new carriages arrived in Belfast in March 2021, they were integrated onto Unit 4017 and tested throughout the summer, until being put into service on 29 September 2021.

Past fleet

Routes 

NIR maintains the following lines:
 Belfast–Dublin, from Belfast to Dublin. Operated with Iarnród Éireann
 Belfast–Portadown – Most services operate from Bangor. The most common terminus is Portadown. At peak times there are services that terminate at Lisburn and Newry. At peak times services operate to and from Belfast.
  Belfast–Bangor Most services operate from Portadown. At peak times services operate from Lisburn, Belfast, and Newry
 Belfast–Larne Most of this line is coastal, with a terminus at Larne harbour.
 Belfast–Londonderry Longest route by time and length. This line is sometimes referred to the Maiden City Flyer, joining the two main cities of Northern Ireland.
 Coleraine–Portrush Mostly used by holidaymakers getting from Belfast. This line has only 4 stations and is the shortest on the network.
 Lisburn–Antrim line No passenger service since 2003. Sometimes used as a diversion for the Londonderry Line and the Newry/Portadown Line.

Signaling is controlled from Coleraine (Coleraine to Portrush), Portadown (the border to Lisburn), and Belfast Lanyon Place (From Lisburn to Belfast and the rest of the network)

Services
NIR operates regular passenger trains along the following routes during the weekday inter-peak:

Suspended routes 
Following the re-opening of the  Antrim – Bleach Green line in June 2001, which had been closed since 1978, NIR ceased passenger operations between Lisburn and Antrim on 29 June 2003.  Combined with the new Dargan Bridge across the River Lagan in Belfast, the Bleach Green route offered faster journeys between Derry, Coleraine, Ballymena, Antrim and Belfast.

The Lisburn-Antrim railway line is still maintained, and occasional crew training operations are performed.  While it is also available as a diversionary route, Knockmore, Ballinderry, Glenavy, Crumlin stations remain closed to the public. The passing loops at Ballinderry and Crumlin have been removed.

Future 

The development of railways in Northern Ireland has been linked to the future economic growth of the region, and as a way of reducing road congestion. One of the major challenges that NIR has faced is the limited number of trains available for service at peak times. The limited fleet size has led to services being cancelled due to failures or delays. This can lead to widespread disruption across the network and potentially a huge loss in revenue. Upon its establishment in 1998, the Northern Ireland Assembly put in place an investment programme costing £100million to bring about major improvements. This saw projects including the purchase of the 3000 Class trains, the complete relaying of the Belfast-Larne line and the construction of a new maintenance depot. Following completion of this, as part of its long-term investment programme for NIR Translink conducted a "Strategic Rail Review" in 2004, an independent review of rail services to determine its funding request under the Comprehensive Spending Review. This report determined that so-called "lesser used lines" were an important and economically viable part of the total network, and that investment should be consistent rather than in the "stop-go" manner of previous years.

A debate in the Northern Ireland Assembly on Monday 14 May 2007 raised several proposals as to how the railway network could be improved:
 Reopening of existing but closed infrastructure, notably the Lisburn-Antrim line
 Improvement of the infrastructure on the Belfast-Londonderry line through, at the very least, the installation of passing loops to allow service frequency to be increased, and upgrading the track to allow higher speeds.

Pressure groups have advocated the protection of former routes, where the track has been lifted but the trackbed remains intact, to enable these to be reinstated for commuter traffic as an alternative to increased road building.

In October 2007, following the CSR that provided funding allocation to the Northern Ireland Executive, the Department for Regional Development announced its draft budget. Conor Murphy, the Regional Development Minister, stated that approximately £137million could be allocated from for investment in the railways for the period 2008–2011.

In June 2008, Brian Guckian, an independent transport researcher from Dublin, presented a wide-ranging proposal to Translink for a £460million expansion of the network called Northern Ireland Network Enhancement (NINE). This proposes the return of the network to several towns that have not had access to rail services for many years; the main part of the proposal would see the Londonderry-Portadown line re-opened, which would link Omagh, Strabane and Dungannon, with branches to Enniskillen and Armagh. However, none of these enhancements are programmed to go to planning over the course of the next decade as of early 2013.

Translink have plans to introduce a new ticketing system in 2018 similar to the system utilised by Irish Rail. This includes the introduction of ticket vending machines, allowing customers to purchase tickets via an electronic interface at the station (as opposed to the current system in which customers must pay staff for the ticket, who in turn print the customer's ticket for them), a 'smart card' 'tap on, tap off' system similar to the Leap Card and contactless payments.

Infrastructure 

The rail network is focused on Greater Belfast. Both the Bangor and Larne lines have been re-laid in recent years, enabling timetable improvements to be delivered. The only significant "inter-city" routes are the main line between Belfast and Dublin, which covers services to Newry; and the Belfast-Derry line. The pressure group Into the West, which campaigns for improved rail links to the North West region, has stated that the need for a quality rail service, as part of a larger integrated transport policy, is vital to the economic development not just for the city of Derry but for the wider cross-border region.

On 21 November 2007, the Regional Development Minister announced that the investment strategy being considered by the NI Executive included the relaying of the Belfast-Londonderry line north of Coleraine, planned to include new signalling and a new crossing loop, allowing more trains. The total cost was £64million, and began in 2011, lasting five years. Prior to the major relaying of the Coleraine-Londonderry section, £12million was spent on improving the section between Ballymena and Coleraine. This saw the stretch between Ballymena and Coleraine closed completely for four months, with a replacement bus service. Trains continued to run between Londonderry, Coleraine and Portrush, with a small fleet stabled at Coleraine – four trains were stabled instead of the three previously reported. Once the project was completed in 2016, there is a further proposal to add two trains per day, enabling journey times between Belfast and Londonderry to be reduced by up to 30 minutes. As part of this plan, Translink envisages an hourly service to Londonderry, half-hourly to Ballymena. There have been proposals to improve the Belfast-Dublin line between Knockmore and Lurgan, enabling journey times to be reduced and frequency increased. This will improve NIR's services and allow an hourly Enterprise service to Dublin.

In May 2008, the Regional Development Minister announced that his department would commission a study, in conjunction with Donegal County Council, to investigate the effects a resurrection of railway services in the north-west of Ireland with a long-term projection of building a railway line connecting Londonderry with Sligo through County Donegal.

As part of NIR's plans for its new rolling stock, it has built a new traincare depot next to Adelaide station on the site of the old freight yard.

Further plans are afoot to double the track from Monkstown to Templepatrick, to further increase capacity on the Londonderry line.

Portadown to Armagh

Airport links 

Speculation remains that the Lisburn-Antrim route could re-open, potentially to offer an alternative Antrim – Lisburn – Belfast service. The line is maintained both for crew training and as a diversionary route, and passes close to Belfast International Airport at Aldergrove. For a number of years there have been suggestions for a station to serve the airport. The airport has marked the building of a new station in its list of future plans, while EasyJet, which is the largest operator into Belfast International, have been strong in advocating an airport rail link. The reopening of the Lisburn-Antrim line is seen not simply in terms of provision of a link to the airport – it would also allow for the further economic development of the area, which has seen increases in population as people use the towns in South Antrim as dormitory settlements for Belfast. In May 2009, the Minister for Regional Development stated that a proposal had been received from a private developer, the Kilbride Group, to restore the Knockmore line, indicating that he would be prepared to part fund a study into this if the local authorities provided the rest of the funding. The route was also included in a wider study of the development of the Northern Rail Corridor published at the end of 2009

The Belfast Metropolitan Area Plan 2015 identifies the need to improve transport links to George Best Belfast City Airport from the city centre. The BMAP proposed a light rail line from the city centre that would have interchanged with a new railway station at Tillysburn, serving both the airport and the Holywood Exchange retail development. However, in April 2008 the decision was taken not to proceed with the light rail project, with the DRD choosing to implement a new bus-based network. The pressure group Rail 21 has stated that the Tillysburn proposal is insufficient for what the new station is expected to provide – a link to the airport, transport provision for Holywood Exchange and a park and ride facility.

There have also been calls, as part of the wider upgrade of the rail route to Derry, for a railway station connecting to City of Derry Airport, which is close to the railway line. However, the Government has determined that the number of passengers using the airport is not sufficient to justify a station.

Rolling stock 
Although the introduction of the Class 3000 trains was a success, they were a like-for-like replacement for the Class 80 units rather than an expansion of the fleet. Due to the limited number of new units, some of NIR's older rolling stock was retained, notably the entire Class 450 on the Belfast-Larne route.  To enable NIR to maintain its levels of service, it upgraded some of its older rolling stock. In 2005, the Class 450 fleet was refurbished to a standard close to that of the Class 3000 units, which saw them through to their withdrawal in 2012. Three four-car Class 80 units were refurbished and a number of locomotives and coaches were converted to push-pull operation with the addition of the DBSO obtained from 'one', to ensure that passenger rolling stock levels were maintained up to the introduction of new rolling stock in 2011 and 2012.

One of the major projects instigated by Translink was "New Trains Two" (formerly "New Trains 2010"), which saw the purchase of a new batch of rolling stock. At minimum, this was to be like-for-like replacement of the Class 450 trains, which were withdrawn in 2012. However, it was determined that to deliver improved frequency of service on the network the size of NIR's fleet had to be increased, and with that must come associated infrastructure improvements. The announcement of the investment programme confirmed "New Trains 2010", which procured 20 new trains to both replace the remaining Class 80 and Class 450 units and provide additional capacity. The specification given by the DRD stated that the new trains are to provide both inner and outer suburban commuter services and express services between Belfast and Dublin. The Class 4000 fleet entered service on Thursday 29 September 2011. Twenty, three-car units have been specified with an option to purchase an additional 20 vehicles, allowing the units to be lengthened to six cars.

In 2021, following the procurement of 21 additional vehicles purchased to extend a number of its Class 4000 units to six-cars, Translink published a new strategy indicating its intention to provide a zero emission service by 2040. As part of this, NI Railways will begin a process to purchase new rolling stock from 2026 to 2027. The intention is to procure or part procure two fleets - a total of 15 three-car units planned to be either bi-mode or tri-mode for NI Railways' own domestic services, and a fleet of 9 eight-car sets for use by Enterprise, the business case for which will be based on zero- or low-carbon technologies.

See also 
 Iarnród Éireann
 Enterprise (train service)
 Rail transport in Ireland
 History of rail transport in Ireland

References

External links 

 
 

Rail transport in Northern Ireland
Passenger rail transport in Northern Ireland
Government-owned companies of Northern Ireland
Train operating companies in the United Kingdom
Railway companies of Ireland
1968 establishments in Northern Ireland
Economy of Northern Ireland
Railway companies of the United Kingdom
Government-owned railway companies